Francis Field (23 December 1904 – 4 June 1985) was an Australian politician.

Born in North Carlton to public servant William John Field and Kate Emily Honeybone, he attended St Mary's Primary School in Dandenong and St Kevin's College before studying at Melbourne University, from which he graduated with a Master of Arts and a Bachelor of Law. In 1930 he was admitted as a solicitor, practising in Dandenong and Melbourne. On 23 June 1934 Field married Aileen Mary O'Brien, with whom he had five children. He was elected to the Victorian Legislative Assembly in 1937 as the Labor member for Dandenong. In September 1943 he was briefly Minister of Public Instruction; after serving in the Royal Australian Air Force (1942–45) he resumed the office in November 1945, when he was also appointed Deputy Premier. He lost his seat at the 1947 election.

References

1904 births
1985 deaths
Members of the Victorian Legislative Assembly
Melbourne Law School alumni
Australian solicitors
Royal Australian Air Force personnel of World War II
20th-century Australian lawyers
Australian Labor Party members of the Parliament of Victoria
20th-century Australian politicians
People from Carlton North, Victoria
Politicians from Melbourne
Military personnel from Melbourne